Jonis Khoris (born 15 March 1989) is an Italian footballer of Moroccan descent who plays for Serie D club Vis Artena.

Biography
Born in Siderno, region of Calabria, some sources claim that he was born in Bucharest, Romania. However, he clarified that he was not born in Bucharest. Khoris started his career in Genoa before returned to southern Italy, for Reggina in January 2005. In 2006–07 season he was loaned to Vibonese of Serie C2. He made his club debut for Reggina in January 2008, losing to Internazionale 0–3. Before the match Reggina already losing the first leg of 2007–08 Coppa Italia. In January 2009, he was loaned to Prima Divisione club Ravenna with option to sign outright. He played once in first team and also played for its Berretti team, the top team in youth ranks.

In 2009–10 season, at first he joined Taranto on reported free transfer, which he appeared in 2009–10 Coppa Italia as unused sub. In August 2009 signed an annual contract with Barletta. In February 2010 he was released.

In November 2010, he re-joined Reggina on reported 3-year contract. On 26 January 2011 he was loaned to Lucchese. In 2011–12 season, he picked unoccupied no.8 shirt. The shirt remained unoccupied after the departure of Khoris until January 2012 the arrival of Marco Armellino.

On 29 August 2011, he joined Giulianova. However, in January 2012 he was sent back to Reggio Calabria. In July 2012 he joined HinterReggio.

On 30 July 2013, Khoris was signed by Empoli on free transfer, with team-mate Antonio Angelino joined the Tuscan team a day later. On 12 August 2013 Khoris joined Gavorrano in co-ownership deal. Gavorrano also signed Angelino outright from Empoli on 8 August.

References

External links
 Football.it Profile 

1989 births
People from Siderno
Sportspeople from the Metropolitan City of Reggio Calabria
Footballers from Calabria
Italian people of Moroccan descent
Italian sportspeople of African descent
Living people
Italian footballers
Association football midfielders
Genoa C.F.C. players
Reggina 1914 players
U.S. Vibonese Calcio players
Ravenna F.C. players
Taranto F.C. 1927 players
A.S.D. Barletta 1922 players
S.S.D. Lucchese 1905 players
Giulianova Calcio players
U.S. Gavorrano players
A.S.D. Roccella players
A.S.D. Gallipoli Football 1909 players
U.S. Castrovillari Calcio players
A.S.D. Civitavecchia 1920 players
A.S.D. S.C. Palazzolo players
A.S.D. Paternò 1908 players
Serie C players
Serie D players
Eccellenza players